This is a list of ITS (intelligent transportation systems) associations.

ITS organisations are present worldwide. The work of these associations is often supported by local governments
The estimated worth of the market is US$9.6 Billion (2014–2015 In 2015, the intelligent transportation system (ITS) market in roadways was valued at US$20.94 billion

ITS  organisations

Africa 

 ITS Africa with the regional members

 ITS Ethiopia
 ITS Nigeria
 ITS South Africa

Americas 

 ITS Argentina
 ITS America
 ITS Brasil
 ITS Canada
 ITS Chile
 ITS Colombia
 ITS México

Asia 
 ITS Israel
 ITS Turkey is member of ERTICO, the European organisation

Asia Pacific 
 ITS Asia-Pacific with the regional members

 ITS Australia
 ITS China
 ITS Hongkong
 ITS Japan
 ITS Indonesia assisted by the Japan International Cooperation Agency (JICA)
 ITS Korea
 ITS Malaysia
 ITS New Zealand
 ITS Singapore
 ITS Taiwan
 ITS Thailand

Europe 

In Europe the European Union, by the European Commission through financial instruments and through legislative instruments are supported innovative projects in IST directly as well by the regional ITS.

 ITS Europe is represented by ERTICO

 ITS Belgium.
 ITS Denmark
 ITS France
 ITS Deutschland
 ITS Hellas
 ITS Italia
 RDW Netherlands
 ITS-Norge
 ITS Polska
 ITS России
 ITS España
 ITS Sverige

See also 
 List of countries by motor vehicle production

External links

References 

Institution of Engineering and Technology